Yugoslavia took part in the 1983 Eurovision Song Contest held in Munich, West Germany. It was represented by Daniel who sang Džuli.

Before Eurovision

Jugovizija 1983 
Jugovizija 1983 took place on 4 March 1983 at the Studio M in Novi Sad, hosted by Vesna Momirov and Tomislav Dražić. The winner of the national final was selected by 6 state, and 2 autonomous areas juries.

At Eurovision

On the night of contest Yugoslavia performed 12th, following Netherlands and preceding Cyprus. At the close of voting "Džuli" had received 125 points, placing 4th out of 20 competing countries, which was Yugoslavia's joint-best placing at the contest, sharing with 1962 Yugoslav entry "Ne pali svetla u sumrak" by Lola Novaković, and would remain so until their victory in 1989.

The Yugoslav jury awarded its 12 points to contest winners Luxembourg.

Voting

References

1983
Countries in the Eurovision Song Contest 1983
Eurovision